Dora may stand for:
Dora (given name)

Places

United States 
Dora, Alabama
Dora, Arkansas
Dora, Missouri
Dora, New Mexico
 Dora, Oregon
Dora, Pennsylvania
Mount Dora, Florida

Other countries 
Lake Dora (Tasmania)
Lake Dora (Western Australia)
Dora, Baghdad, Iraq
Dora, Cyprus
Dora, Lebanon
Dura, Hebron, in the Israeli West Bank
Dorasan or Mount Dora, a hill in South Korea
Dora Beel, a lake in Assam (India)
Dora Baltea river and Dora Riparia river, northern Italy

Entertainment
 Dora the Explorer, American children's television program
 Dora and the Lost City of Gold, a 2019 live-action movie loosely based on the TV program
 Dora (TV series), a 1973 British sitcom series
 Dora (1933 film), a British comedy film
 Dora (2017 film), a Tamil language horror thriller movie
 Dora Mavor Moore Award for Canadian professional theatre
 "Dora", 1984 song by Ambitious Lovers from the album Envy
 Dora, a designated bonus tile used in Japanese Mahjong
 Doraemon, Japanese anime and manga in Tv Asahi 
 Dora, fictional character in the webcomic Erfworld
 Dora Bianchi, fictional character in the webcomic Questionable Content
 Dora Spenlow, fictional character in David Copperfield by Charles Dickens
 Dora, one of Lazarus Long's primary spacecraft, and her sentient integral computer, in novels by Robert A. Heinlein
 Nymphadora Tonks, fictional character in the Harry Potter universe
 HRT Dora, Croatian music festival and preselection venue for the Eurovision Song Contest

Military and war
 Dora (artillery), 80cm German railway artillery pieces
 Dora I, and Dora II, German U-boat bases in Trondheim, Norway
 Dora, code name of World War II Soviet intelligence agent Alexander Radó
 Defence of the Realm Act 1914 (DORA), British war legislation adopted in August 1914
 Fw 190 D "Dora", model of Focke-Wulf Fw 190 German fighter aircraft
 Mittelbau-Dora, World War II concentration camp

Other uses
 DORA, acronym in computer networking for Discover, Offer, Request, Acknowledge process in the DHCP protocol
 668 Dora, main belt asteroid
 Dora (case study) of Sigmund Freud, described in A Case of Hysteria
 Dora (grape), another name for the Italian wine grape Fortana
 Dora (sternwheeler), a 1910 steamboat in Oregon
 SS Dora, one of at least two steamships active in the late 19th and early 20th centuries
 Dora, a medieval title of the feudal landlord in the Telangana region of India
 dumb Dora, a slang term from the 1920s meaning "idiotic woman"
 Tropical Storm Dora (disambiguation), list of tropical cyclones worldwide named Dora
 DORA, the San Francisco Declaration on Research Assessment, intending to halt the practice of correlating the journal impact factor to the merits of a specific scientist's contributions
 Dual orexin receptor antagonist, a type of sleep medication
 Abbreviation for the gene downregulated by activation also known as IGSF6

See also
Doralice
Dorothea (disambiguation)
Dorothy (given name)
Theodora (disambiguation)
Dorie (disambiguation)